Petra Kvitová was the defending champion, but she lost to Sorana Cîrstea in the quarterfinals.

World No. 1 Serena Williams won the title for the third time, defeating Cîrstea 6–2, 6–0 in the final. The victory gave Williams her eighth title of 2013 and fifty-fourth career WTA title.

Seeds
The top eight seeds receive a bye into the second round.

Draw

Finals

Top half

Section 1

Section 2

Bottom half

Section 3

Section 4

Qualifying

Seeds

Qualifiers

Lucky losers

Qualifying draw

First qualifier

Second qualifier

Third qualifier

Fourth qualifier

Fifth qualifier

Sixth qualifier

Seventh qualifier

Eighth qualifier

Ninth qualifier

Tenth qualifier

Eleventh qualifier

Twelfth qualifier

References
General

Specific

2013 WTA Tour
Women's Singles
2013 in Canadian women's sports